Carmen Gloria Pérez (born October 25, 1980) is a Puerto Rican-American actor, artist, writer, and filmmaker who is best known for her roles in the Swedish Netflix original series, Young Royals, A Storm for Christmas and Lucha Underground.

Early life and education
Pérez was born on October 25, 1980, in The Bronx, New York. At the age of 17, Pérez joined the United States Army, where she served for six years.

Career
Pérez has appeared in several television shows and films such as Nip/Tuck, He's Just Not That Into You, Everybody Hates Chris, The Shield, and A Man Apart. She is also an author and illustrator of the Kid Astronomy book series. As a jazz singer, she released her EP titled The Art Of Love in 2018, which was nominated for Best Jazz EP by the Independent Music Awards 2019. Her songs Emergency and Overload, with Dauman Music, were ranked Top 40 in the Billboard Hot Dance Club Play and UK Pop charts.

Pérez is the recipient of the Valley Theatre League ADA Best Supporting Actress Award for her role in the play Soldiers Don't Cry by Layon Gray. She has been featured in several media outlets for her achievements as a diverse artist, including All About Jazz, Billboard, Latina Style Magazine, and others.

Books
Pérez is the author of the Kid Astronomy children's book series, which has been published by Uncommon Grammar. The titles of her books include The Moon Show, Dear Pluto, and Thank You Mercury!.

Awards
Pérez has received the Valley Theatre League ADA Best Supporting Actress Award for her role in the play Soldiers Don't Cry by Layon Gray.

References

American people of Puerto Rican descent
American actresses
1980 births
Living people